George Noah Beamer (October 9, 1904 – October 21, 1974) was an American judge and politician who served as United States district judge of the United States District Court for the Northern District of Indiana. Beamer also served also the 30th Indiana Attorney General from 1941 to 1943.

Education and career

Born in Bowling Green, Indiana, Beamer received a Bachelor of Laws from Notre Dame Law School in 1929. He was in private practice in South Bend, Indiana from 1929 to 1962. He was a City Judge in South Bend from 1933 to 1935, a prosecuting attorney of St. Joseph County, Indiana from 1937 to 1939, and a city attorney of South Bend from 1939 to 1941. Beamer, a Democrat, held the office of Attorney General of Indiana from 1941 to 1943, serving in the administration of Democratic Governor Henry F. Schricker. Beamer was Chairman of the Indiana Public Service Commission in Indianapolis from 1943 to 1944.

Federal judicial service

On March 8, 1962, Beamer was nominated by President John F. Kennedy to a new seat on the United States District Court for the Northern District of Indiana created by 75 Stat. 80. He was confirmed by the United States Senate on April 11, 1962, and received his commission on April 12, 1962. He served as Chief Judge from 1972 until his death on October 21, 1974.

References

Sources
 

1904 births
1974 deaths
Notre Dame Law School alumni
Indiana Attorneys General
Judges of the United States District Court for the Northern District of Indiana
United States district court judges appointed by John F. Kennedy
20th-century American judges
People from Clay County, Indiana
20th-century American lawyers
People from Mishawaka, Indiana
American Freemasons
Indiana Democrats